Kevin Pierre-Louis (born October 7, 1991) is an American football linebacker for the Houston Texans of the National Football League (NFL). He played college football at Boston College and was drafted by the Seattle Seahawks in the fourth round of the 2014 NFL Draft. He has also played for the Kansas City Chiefs, New York Jets, Chicago Bears, and Washington Football Team.

High school career
Pierre-Louis attended King Low Heywood Thomas, which is a private, co-educational day school in Stamford, Connecticut, where he played middle linebacker and fullback. In 2009, he recorded 159 tackles in nine games. He also registered three interceptions, returning two for touchdowns, two sacks, two forced fumbles and two fumble recoveries. Offensively, he rushed for 914 yards and 13 touchdowns on 77 carries. He was selected as the 2009-10 Gatorade Football Player of the Year for the state of Connecticut.

Considered a four-star recruit by Rivals.com, he was rated as the 10th best outside linebacker prospect of his class. He committed to Boston College over offers from Duke, Stanford, and Virginia.

College career
Pierre-Louis attended Boston College from 2010 to 2013, where he played for the Boston College Eagles football team. As a true freshman, he started all 13 games, finishing second on the team with 93 tackles. In 2011, he started the first nine games before missing the last three due to an injury. He still finished second on the team in tackles with 74, added seven tackles for loss, and returned a fumble 96 yards for a touchdown against UMass. In 2012, he started nine games for the Eagles, finishing the season ranked fourth on the team with 85 tackles, including four for loss, two sacks and three pass-break ups. As a senior, he started all 13 games, setting new career highs in tackles (108), tackles for loss (10.5) and sacks (six). He also intercepted his first career pass, returning it 33 yards for a touchdown against Virginia Tech. After the season, he was named a first-team All-ACC.

Professional career

Seattle Seahawks
Pierre-Louis was drafted by the Seattle Seahawks in the fourth round (132nd overall) of the 2014 NFL Draft. Pierre-Louis made his NFL debut on September 21, 2014 in an overtime win against the Denver Broncos, he recorded one tackle in the game. Pierre-Louis was placed on season-ending injured reserve for a shoulder injury. He finished the season with 10 tackles in seven games.

Kansas City Chiefs
On July 28, 2017, Pierre-Louis was traded to the Kansas City Chiefs in exchange for D. J. Alexander.

New York Jets
On March 17, 2018, Pierre-Louis signed a two-year contract with the New York Jets. On August 11, 2018, Pierre-Louis was suspended the first game of the 2018 season for violating the NFL's Policy and Program for Substances of Abuse. He played in nine games before being placed on injured reserve on December 29, 2018. On February 19, 2019, the Jets declined the option on Pierre-Louis' contract, making him a free agent.

Chicago Bears
On May 8, 2019, Pierre-Louis signed a one-year contract with the Chicago Bears. In week 16 against the Kansas City Chiefs, Pierre-Louis recorded a team high 12 tackles during the 26–3 loss. The following week against the Minnesota Vikings, Pierre-Louis recorded his first career interception off a pass thrown by Sean Mannion during a 21–19 win.

Washington Football Team
Pierre-Louis signed a one-year contract with the Washington Football Team on March 31, 2020, then known as the Redskins prior to a name change later that offseason.

Houston Texans
In March 2021, Pierre-Louis signed a two-year contract worth up to $8 million with the Houston Texans. He was placed on injured reserve on September 16, 2021 with a hamstring injury. He was activated on October 23.

On August 30, 2022, Pierre-Louis was waived by the Texans and signed to the practice squad the next day. He was promoted to the active roster on September 10, 2022. He suffered a groin injury in Week 2 and was placed on injured reserve on September 20, 2022.

Personal life
Pierre-Louis is of Haitian descent; his father is from Léogâne and his mother's family lives in Port-au-Prince. His family in Haiti run sugarcane plantations, ice factories, and rent out property.

References

External links
 Houston Texans bio
 Boston College Eagles bio

Living people
1991 births
Sportspeople from Norwalk, Connecticut
Players of American football from Connecticut
American sportspeople of Haitian descent
American football linebackers
Boston College Eagles football players
Seattle Seahawks players
Kansas City Chiefs players
New York Jets players
Chicago Bears players
Washington Football Team players
Houston Texans players